Humid Teenage Mediocrity 1992–1996 was a release of material by Jack Off Jill. It was released on the label Sympathy for the Record Industry in the US, and Livewire/Cargo Records in Europe.

The album consists of early singles released on singer Jessicka's Rectum Records label and demo versions of songs which later appeared on Sexless Demons and Scars, the band's full-length debut album. Marilyn Manson is credited with production of 17 tracks, and contributes sleeve notes.

Track listing
"Hypocrite" – 3:02
"Horrible" – 2:29
"Kringle" – 2:52
"Lollirot" – 2:39
"Media C-Section" – 1:51
"My Cat ('94)" – 3:07
"Super Sadist" – 1:49
"Spit and Rape" – 3:25
"Swollen ('94)" – 3:23
"Yellow Brick Road" – 2:18
"American Made" – 3:27
"Boy Grinder" – 3:45
"Bruises are Back in Style" – 3:44
"Cherry Scented" – 1:23
"Chocolate Chicken" – 1:28
"Choke" – 4:00
"Confederate Fag" – 1:27
"Cumdumpster" – 2:22
"Don't Wake the Baby ('95)" – 1:43
"Everything's Brown" – 3:55
"French Kiss the Elderly" – 3:43
"Girlscout" – 3:18
"Working with Meat" (US version only)
"Cockroach Waltz" (US version only)

Personnel
 Jessicka — vocals
 Agent Moulder— bass, piano
 Michelle Inhell— guitar
 Tenni Ah Cha Cha— drums
 Marilyn Manson— producer (Tracks: 1 - 10, 12 - 14, 16, 18, 19, 21, 22), Additional guitar track on 'Swollen', Credited as "Sausage Pot Bri"

Jack Off Jill albums
2006 compilation albums
Albums produced by Marilyn Manson
Albums produced by Jeremy Staska